Taylor James Gabriel (born February 17, 1991) is a former American football wide receiver who played for six seasons in the National Football League (NFL). After playing college football at Abilene Christian, he signed with the Cleveland Browns as an undrafted free agent in 2014. He also played with the Atlanta Falcons and Chicago Bears.

Early years
Gabriel attended John Horn High School in Mesquite, Texas, where he played football, basketball, and ran track for the Jaguars athletic teams. In football, he was a three-year letterman at wide receiver, cornerback, and kick returner. He was an All-District selection as a junior after he had 47 catches for 588 yards and four touchdowns. He earned Class 5A TSWA All-State as senior in 2008 after totalling 90 catches for 1,354 yards with 13 touchdowns for a 4–7 team with the school’s first playoff bid. He was also named APSE second team all-state and was the District 11-5A MVP.

College career
Gabriel enrolled to play college football at Abilene Christian University, where he holds the record for most career touchdowns, from 2010 to 2013. In the 2010 season, he finished with 26 receptions for 295 receiving yards. In the 2011 season, he had 64 receptions for 988 receiving yards and ten touchdowns. In the 2012 season, he finished with 52 receptions for 684 receiving yards and seven touchdowns. In his final season with the team in 2013, he had 73 receptions for 1,060 receiving yards and ten touchdowns. He finished his career, second in school history with 215 receptions for 3,027 yards and 27 touchdowns.

Professional career

Cleveland Browns
Gabriel was signed by the Cleveland Browns after going undrafted in the 2014 NFL Draft.

Gabriel made his NFL debut on September 7, 2014, against the Pittsburgh Steelers, recording one reception for five yards. In Week 9, against the Tampa Bay Buccaneers, he caught 34-yard pass from quarterback Brian Hoyer for his first career touchdown reception. He finished the 2014 season with 36 receptions for 621 yards and a touchdown. In the 2015 season, he recorded 28 receptions for 241 yards. On September 3, 2016, Gabriel was released by the Browns.

Atlanta Falcons
Gabriel was claimed off waivers by the Atlanta Falcons on September 4, 2016. In Atlanta's Week 12 game against the Arizona Cardinals, he scored two touchdowns, helping to lead the Falcons to a 38–19 win. In Week 14 against the Los Angeles Rams, he had three receptions for 82 yards and scored one touchdown in the 42–14 victory. He played a significant role for the Falcons throughout the season, which was successful and resulted in an appearance in Super Bowl LI, where they lost to the New England Patriots in overtime by a score of 34–28. Gabriel had three receptions for 76 yards in the Super Bowl. Overall, in the 2016 regular season, Gabriel recorded 35 receptions for 579 yards and six touchdowns.

On March 8, 2017, the Falcons placed a second-round tender on Gabriel. He officially signed his tender on April 22, 2017. In the 2017 season, Gabriel played in 16 games with four starts, recording 33 receptions for 378 yards and one touchdown.

Chicago Bears
On March 14, 2018, Gabriel signed a four-year $26 million contract with the Chicago Bears.

2018 season

On September 9, Gabriel made his Bears debut, catching five passes for 25 yards in the season-opening 24–23 road loss to the Green Bay Packers. On September 30, 2018, he caught a season-high seven passes for 104 yards and two touchdowns in a 48–10 victory over the Tampa Bay Buccaneers. This was the second time he caught two touchdowns in a single game, the last time was with the Atlanta Falcons in 2016. On October 14, Gabriel had five receptions for 110 yards in the 31–28 overtime loss to the Miami Dolphins in Week 6.

Gabriel finished the 2018 season with the Bears with 67 catches for 688 yards and two touchdowns.

2019 season

During Week 3 against the Washington Redskins, Gabriel caught six passes for 75 yards and three touchdowns in the 31–15 road victory, though he exited the game with a concussion. He was the 35th player in NFL history to score three receiving touchdowns in the first half of a game and the first Bears player to do so in the Super Bowl era. Gabriel was also the fourth player in Bears history to accomplish the feat in one quarter after Red Pollock (1935), Frank Minini (1948), and Gale Sayers (1965). Gabriel was forced to miss the following week's game against the Minnesota Vikings. Without Gabriel, the Bears won 16–6. He finished the 2019 season with 29 receptions for 353 yards and four touchdowns along with 20 rushing yards.

On February 21, 2020, Gabriel was released by the Bears after two seasons in a move to create cap space. 

On April 9, 2021, Gabriel announced his retirement.

NFL career statistics

Regular season

Postseason

References

External links

Abilene Christian Wildcats bio

1991 births
Living people
Abilene Christian Wildcats football players
American football wide receivers
Atlanta Falcons players
Chicago Bears players
Cleveland Browns players
John Horn High School alumni
People from Mesquite, Texas
Players of American football from Texas
Sportspeople from the Dallas–Fort Worth metroplex